Yao Hanlin (born 16 April 1985 in Wuhan) is a retired Chinese professional footballer who played as a midfielder. He spent almost his entire playing career at his hometown Wuhan, first at Wuhan Guanggu from 2004 to their disbandment in 2008, and then Wuhan Zall from 2010 to 2022, where he served as long-time captain for the latter.

Club career
Yao Hanlin began his professional football career in 2004 when he was promoted to the senior team of second tier club Wuhan Guanggu by Head coach Pei Encai and was part of the squad that won the division title and promotion to the top tier. The following seasons he would gain more playing time and was often deployed as a substitute until the team were disbanded during the 2008 league season after the club had a dispute with the Chinese Football Association over their on-field behaviour after the club's management did not accept the punishment given to them by the Chinese Football Association after a scuffle broke out during a league game against Beijing Guoan on 27 September 2008. With several other Wuhan players he would transfer to the newly promoted side Jiangsu Sainty at the beginning of the 2009 league season to join up with his former manager Pei Encai. His time at Jiangsu saw him become an integral member within the side and he would personally make 28 league appearances before he had a chance to return Hubei with second tier club Hubei Oriental at the beginning of the 2010 league season.

As the club renamed themselves Wuhan Zall, Yao would be an integral member of the squad that came runners-up within the division and gain promotion to the top tier. After only one season within the top flight the club were relegated at the end of the 2013 Chinese Super League season. Yao would remain an integral member of the squad until the club eventually won promotion again by winning the 2018 China League One division.

Yao retired at the end of the 2021 season. Wuhan announced that the club will retire Yao's No.8 shirt number, which was the first time a shirt number was retired for a player in the history of Chinese professional football (Many Chinese clubs had retired their No.12 shirt number as a dedication to supporters).

Career statistics
Statistics accurate as of match played 3 January 2022.

Honours

Club
Wuhan Guanggu
 Chinese Football Association Jia League: 2004
 Chinese Super League Cup: 2005

Wuhan Zall
 China League One: 2018

References

External links
Player stats at sports.sohu.com
 

1985 births
Living people
Footballers from Wuhan
Chinese footballers
Wuhan Guanggu players
Jiangsu F.C. players
Wuhan F.C. players
Chinese Super League players
China League One players
Association football midfielders
21st-century Chinese people